Barnard Franklin "Barney" Bentall (born March 14, 1956) is a Canadian pop/rock singer-songwriter who is most well known for his 1990s-era band, Barney Bentall and the Legendary Hearts.  Their most successful Canadian singles included "Something to Live For",  "Life Could Be Worse", "Crime Against Love" and "Come Back to Me". He has also recorded under the pseudonym Brandon Wolf.

Early life
Bentall grew up in Calgary, Alberta, the son of a Baptist minister. His family owns Dominion Construction and the Bentall Centre, in the downtown core of Vancouver, British Columbia.

Career
Bentall recorded and toured with his band, the Legendary Hearts, for ten years. He then started a cattle ranch in 1997 in British Columbia.  In 2006, he released his first solo album titled Gift Horse on True North Records on August 3, 2006. In 2008, he released a DVD of his live The Grand Cariboo Opry show, which included a 12-track audio CD.

In 2009, Bentall joined Shari Ulrich and Tom Taylor to release the album "Live" at Cates Hill.

Bentall teamed up with Ulrich again in 2010 to form The High Bar Gang, a bluegrass-styled band. The band features Shari Ulrich, Kirby Barber and Wendy Bird for vocal harmony along with Rob Becker, Colin Nairne, and David Barber.

In 2016, Bentall, Shari Ulrich and Tom Taylor, calling their trio "BTU", released an album of folk music, Tightrope Walk.

In 2017 , Bentall released the western album “ The Drifter and The Preacher “ .

Personal life
His son Dustin Bentall is also a professional musician, while his daughter Jessica Bentall is married to former NHL player Rob Niedermayer.

Solo discography

References

External links 
Barney Bentall's Official Site

1956 births
Living people
Canadian rock singers
Canadian male singer-songwriters
Canadian singer-songwriters
Musicians from Vancouver
Musicians from Toronto
People educated at Western Canada High School